The 1954 Toledo Rockets football team was an American football team that represented Toledo University in the Mid-American Conference (MAC) during the 1954 college football season. In their first season under head coach Forrest England, the Rockets compiled a 6–2–1 record (3–2 against MAC opponents), finished in fourth place in the MAC, and outscored their opponents by a combined total of 205 to 113.

The team's statistical leaders included Jerry Nowak with 393 passing yards, Mel Triplett with 803 rushing yards, and  Dick Basich with 255 receiving yards.

Schedule

References

Toledo
Toledo Rockets football seasons
Toledo Rockets football